"Tears on My Pillow" is a doo-wop song written by Sylvester Bradford and Al Lewis in 1958. The composition was first recorded by Little Anthony and the Imperials on End Records and was that group's debut recording under that name. Their original recording of the song became a Billboard top-10 hit, peaking at  4, No. 3 in Canada, and was the Imperials' first million-seller. It was also a two-sided hit, with its flip side, "Two People in the World," also becoming a major hit. Although it remains one of the Imperials' signature songs, "Tears on My Pillow" has been extensively covered, including a No. 1 in the UK Singles Chart version by Kylie Minogue in January 1990.

The Imperials' original version
Early copies of the single were credited simply to "The Imperials," a group which had previously been known as "The Duponts" and "The Chesters." Brooklyn, New York deejay Alan Freed gave the group's lead singer, Anthony Gourdine, top billing while introducing the single over the air and the moniker of "Little Anthony and the Imperials" stuck.

"Tears on My Pillow" was a #4 hit single in the United States. Selling over a million copies, "Tears on My Pillow" was the most successful single of the Imperials' doo wop period. Its success would be matched only by the Imperials' 1964 single "Goin' Out of My Head."
The Imperials ("Little Anthony" Gourdine, Clarence Collins, Ernest Wright, Tracy Lord, and Nate Rogers - the last two of whom were later replaced by Sammy Strain) performed the song on numerous TV programs, including The Dick Clark Show  and on the PBS Oldies special,  Rock, Rhythm, and Doo-Wop in 1958 and 2002 respectively. They also performed the tune on the American Bandstand 40th Anniversary Special (also in 2002).

Covers
The song has been covered many times, most notably by Kylie Minogue and also by Johnny Tillotson in 1969, his version reaching No. 119 U.S. Billboard, #98 Cash Box and #94 in Canada.

The song was also performed by Sha Na Na in the movie Grease from 1978 and included on the soundtrack.

In 2003, the song was revived and included on the S Club 8 album Sundown. The group of teens also performed it on GreaseMania.

Other uses
"Tears on My Pillow" is referenced by Dean Friedman in his 1977 hit song "Ariel."  It is included in the lyrics, "I met a young girl, she sang mighty fine, 'Tears on My Pillow' and 'Ave Maria'."

The song was also used in the season one seventh episode of Sliders entitled "The Weaker Sex," which originally aired as episode six. The character Rembrandt Brown (played by Cleavant Derricks) sings the song repeatedly on the street in an effort to raise money for a motel room.

Kylie Minogue version

Australian singer Kylie Minogue released a cover of "Tears on My Pillow" as the final single from her second studio album, Enjoy Yourself, on January 8, 1990. Minogue's cover was also included on the soundtrack of the film The Delinquents, which she also starred in. The song reached No. 1 on the UK Singles Chart for one week in January 1990, and reached No. 35 on the Canadian Adult Contemporary Chart.

Critical reception
Bill Coleman from Billboard wrote, "Aussie lass offers a faithful reading of the Little Anthony & the Imperials classic. Pop and AC programmers should take note." A reviewer from Music & Media said the song "has been re-interpreted in a wholly predictable way."

Music video
The accompanying music video for "Tears on My Pillow" shows Kylie in a black dress with a Brigitte Bardot hairstyle singing the song. It is inter-cut with clips from the 1989 film The Delinquents.

Live performances
Minogue performed the song on the following concert tours:
 Disco in Dream/The Hitman Roadshow
 Enjoy Yourself Tour (performed as an a cappella)
 Rhythm of Love Tour
 Let's Get to It Tour
 Anti Tour
 Kylie Summer 2015 Tour (performed as an a cappella)

The song was also performed on:
 The Kylie Show 2007 TV special

Track listings
CD single
 "Tears on My Pillow" - 2:33
 "We Know the Meaning of Love" (Extended) - 5:50
 "Tears on My Pillow" (More Tears Mix) - 4:14

7-inch vinyl single
 "Tears on My Pillow" - 2:28
 "We Know the Meaning of Love" - 3:25

12-inch vinyl single
 "Tears on My Pillow" (More Tears Mix) - 4:14
 "We Know the Meaning of Love" (Extended) - 5:50

US and Canadian cassette
 "Tears on My Pillow" - 2:33
 "Nothing to Lose" - 3:20

Charts and certification

Weekly charts

Year-end charts

Certifications

|}

See also
List of number-one singles from the 1990s (UK)

References

1958 debut singles
1989 singles
1990 singles
Songs written by Al Lewis (lyricist)
Little Anthony and the Imperials songs
The McGuire Sisters songs
Kylie Minogue songs
New Edition songs
Bobby Vee songs
S Club 8 songs
Martha and the Vandellas songs
Bobby Vinton songs
Chuck Jackson songs
Neil Sedaka songs
Reba McEntire songs
Jodeci songs
Lorrie Morgan songs
The Fleetwoods songs
UK Singles Chart number-one singles
Song recordings produced by Stock Aitken Waterman
Doo-wop songs
1958 songs
Pete Waterman Entertainment singles